Blogg is a surname. Notable people with the surname include:

Frances Blogg (1869–1938), British author of verse, songs and school drama
Henry Blogg (1876–1954), British lifeboatman
Wes Blogg (1855–1897), American baseball player

See also
Joe Bloggs, a placeholder name commonly used in UK; similar to John Doe in USA